Marquess of Castel-Moncayo is a hereditary title in the Peerage of Spain accompanied by the dignity of Grandee, granted in 1682 by Charles II to Baltasar de Fuenmayor, ambassador in Denmark–Norway, the Spanish Netherlands and the Republic of Venice.

The 12th Marquess, Carlos Falcó, died in Madrid 20 March 2020 at the age of 83, as a result of COVID-19.

Marquesses of Castel-Moncayo (1682)

 Baltasar de Fuenmayor y Camporredondo, 1st Marquess of Castel-Moncayo
 Manuela de Fuenmayor y Dávila, 2nd Marchioness of Castel-Moncayo
 Gaspara de Saavedra y Fuenmayor, 3rd Marchioness of Castel-Moncayo
 Diego María Sarmiento de Saavedra y Fuenmayor, 4th Marquess of Castel-Moncayo
 María de la Esclavitud Sarmiento De Silva y Sotomayor, 5th Marchioness of Castel-Moncayo
 Carlos José Gutiérrez de los Ríos y Sarmiento de Sotomayor, 6th Marquess of Castel-Moncayo 
 Francisca de Asís Gutiérrez de los Ríos y Solís, 7th Marchioness of Castel-Moncayo
 María del Pilar Osorio y Gutiérrez de los Ríos, 8th Marchioness of Castel-Moncayo
 Felipe Falcó y Osorio, 9th Marquess of Castel-Moncayo
 Paloma Falcó y Escandón, 10th Marchioness of Castel-Moncayo
 Manuel Falcó y Escandón, 11th Marquess of Castel-Moncayo
 Carlos Falcó y Fernández de Córdoba, 12th Marquess of Castel-Moncayo
 Manuel Falcó y Girod, 13th Marquess of Castel-Moncayo

The heir apparent is the present holder's eldest son Carlos, born in 1999 and educated at Harrow School and at the University of Southern California.

See also
Marquess of Griñón
List of current Grandees of Spain

References

Grandees of Spain
Marquesses of Spain
Lists of Spanish nobility
Noble titles created in 1682